Matteo Bucosse (born 23 October 2002) is an Italian professional footballer who plays as a goalkeeper for Italian club Tolentino.

Career 
Bucosse began playing youth football at Montemilione Pollenza in 2009, before moving to Serie D club Tolentino in 2019. He played 18 games in 2019–20, 15 in the league and three in the cup.

On 8 September 2020, Bucosse joined Serie C club Juventus U23, the reserve team of Juventus, on loan. He made his Serie C debut on 13 December 2020, in a 1–0 defeat to Alessandria.

References

External links 
 
 

2002 births
Living people
People from Macerata
Sportspeople from the Province of Macerata
Footballers from Marche
Italian footballers
Association football goalkeepers
Serie D players
Serie C players
Juventus Next Gen players